Zargaran-e Olya (also Romanized as Zargarān-e ‘Olyā; also known as Zargīna, Zargina Buzurg, and Zargirān Buzurg) is a village in Chalanchulan Rural District, Silakhor District, Dorud County, Lorestan Province, Iran. At the 2006 census, its population was 740, in 190 families.

References 

Towns and villages in Dorud County